The 1972–73 Superliga Espanola de Hockey Hielo season was the first season of the Superliga Espanola de Hockey Hielo, the top level of ice hockey in Spain. Six teams participated in the league, and Real Sociedad won the championship.

Teams
 FC Barcelona
 CH Jaca
 CH Madrid
 CG Puigcerdà
 Real Sociedad
 CH Valladolid

Standings

External links
Season on hockeyarchives.info

Spain
Liga Nacional de Hockey Hielo seasons
Liga